Colby Miller (born February 19, 1980) is an MTV VJ for MTV Asia. He began his career as an MTV VJ after winning the Philippine MTV VJ Hunt 2005.

Biography

Early life
Miller was born in Spanaway, Washington.  He graduated in 2004 from Central Washington University with a degree in Biology. He was born to an American father of German and Irish descent and a Filipina mother.

Career
Miller began his career as an MTV VJ after winning the Philippine MTV VJ Hunt 2005. He also won the first ever ASEAN MTV VJ Hunt held in Bali, Indonesia, where he competed against other winners of MTV VJ Hunts from around the region.  Colby is currently based in Singapore where he hosts for MTV Asia in shows such as Pop Inc.

Personal life
Miller enjoys basketball, hiking, outdoor activities as well as visiting the gym.  He is also the brother of Troy Montero and K. C. Montero.

Television series
"MTV Supahstar: The Supahsearch" 2004

References

1980 births
Living people
Filipino people of American descent
Filipino people of German descent
Participants in Philippine reality television series
Filipino people of Irish descent
VJs (media personalities)
People from Spanaway, Washington